WWF Superstars of Wrestling (later shortened to  WWF Superstars and to Sunday Morning Superstars ), also referred to as Maple Leaf Wrestling in Canada was an American professional wrestling television program that was produced by the World Wrestling Federation (WWF, now WWE). It debuted on September 6, 1986, as the flagship program of the WWF's syndicated programming.

In January 2019, select episodes of WWF Superstars starting from April 1992 became available for streaming on the WWE Network.  As of January 23, 2023, there are 310 episodes of Superstars available for streaming on WWE Network, dating from April 18, 1992 to July 20, 1996.

History

Early format
In September 1986, Superstars replaced WWF Championship Wrestling. Before that, WWF Superstars of Wrestling was the name of a weekly recap show hosted by Vince McMahon (or Gene Okerlund) and Lord Alfred Hayes that lasted from 1984 through August 1986. The new version of Superstars was the program on which all the angles began and at times ended and on which the majority of title changes took place if not at a pay-per-view event (e.g. WrestleMania or SummerSlam). Matches primarily saw top-tier and mid-level talent vs. Jobbers; pre-taped interviews with the WWF's roster of superstars; and promos featuring the wrestlers. At times, there was a "feature" match between main WWF talent. As with all syndicated WWF programming, another major aspect of the show was to promote house shows and TV tapings in each market.

During its syndication run, the program was re-branded and aired in some parts of Canada as Maple Leaf Wrestling (essentially replacing a program of the same name filmed in southern Ontario), despite having almost no Canadian content other than interviews promoting matches that were to be held in Canada, along with occasional program-exclusive matches taped at Maple Leaf Gardens in Toronto, Ontario. However, this repackaging was, at the time, sufficient to allow the program to count towards Canadian content requirements for local television stations. Some Canadian viewers were able to watch American feeds of the show and/or "WWF Challenge."

The show also began airing in 1986 in the United Kingdom on Saturday nights on Sky Channel. For a short time, it was shown on Tuesdays on Eurosport. Early in the 1990s, it was featured in a Friday night time slot. In the mid-1990s, Superstars was then moved to a Sunday morning time slot. For most of it original run in the United Kingdom Gorilla Monsoon was the play-by-play commentator with various color commentators throughout its history.

Beginning with the April 18, 1992 episode, the program was renamed to WWF Superstars, due to a successful lawsuit by another promoter, Albert Patterson, who had claimed prior rights to the phrase "Superstars of Wrestling". Since then, archival footage of the program has usually been shown with the words "of Wrestling" blurred out where applicable.

Change in format
In September 1996, Superstars left syndication and moved to pay TV channel USA Network in place of WWF Action Zone, which the network cancelled. Although for a brief period the show continued in its same format, as time went on more and more recaps of the WWF's other programming began to fill the hour. By March 1997, Superstars was solely a summary program and continued in that manner until its eventual ending.

In 1997, the format of Superstars as aired in the United Kingdom also changed and began to only feature weekly summaries of Monday Night Raw. Following the premiere of SmackDown!, Superstars served as a summary show for SmackDown! as well.

When the WWF moved its cable TV contract to TNN (later known as Spike, now known as the Paramount Network) in October 1, 2000, Superstars moved with it. The show was then discontinued in August 19, 2001. The show continued until December 2002 in the UK, until it was replaced by Heat in January 2003.

Title changes
Many of these title changes were not aired for up to several weeks after they took place. As these shows were aired in an era before the Internet was popularized, the previous title holder sometimes defended his title at house shows as though he were still the champion until the title change was aired on television.

The Hart Foundation (Bret "Hitman" Hart and Jim "The Anvil" Neidhart) defeating the British Bulldogs (Dynamite Kid and Davey Boy Smith) for the WWF World Tag Team Championship on February 7, 1987 (taped January 26, 1987).
The Honky Tonk Man defeating Ricky "The Dragon" Steamboat for the WWF Intercontinental Heavyweight Championship on June 13, 1987 (taped June 2, 1987).
Strike Force (Rick Martel and Tito Santana) defeating the Hart Foundation for the WWF World Tag Team Championship on November 7, 1987 (taped October 27, 1987).
Demolition (Ax and Smash) defeating the Brain Busters (Arn Anderson and Tully Blanchard) for the WWF World Tag Team Championship on November 4, 1989 (taped October 2, 1989).
The Colossal Connection (André the Giant and Haku) defeating Demolition for the WWF World Tag Team Championship on December 30, 1989 (taped December 13, 1989).
Mr. Perfect defeating Tito Santana for the vacant WWF Intercontinental Heavyweight Championship on May 19, 1990 (taped April 23, 1990).
Mr. Perfect defeating Kerry Von Erich for the WWF Intercontinental Heavyweight Championship on December 15, 1990 (taped November 19, 1990).
Diesel defeating Razor Ramon for the WWF Intercontinental Championship on April 30, 1994 (taped April 13, 1994).

Commentators
The commentary team on Superstars underwent many changes as the years passed. The hosts of Superstars are listed below in chronological order along with their debut episode.

Vince McMahon, Jesse "The Body" Ventura, and Bruno Sammartino (September 6, 1986)
McMahon and Ventura (March 19, 1988)
McMahon and Rowdy Roddy Piper (August 25, 1990)
McMahon, Piper, and "The Mouth of the South" Jimmy Hart (for one week only)
McMahon, Piper, and The Honky Tonk Man (December 8, 1990) (only lasts through January 19, 1991)
McMahon, Piper, and "Macho Man" Randy Savage (March 30, 1991)
McMahon, Piper, and Mr. Perfect (November 30, 1991)
McMahon and Perfect (December 14, 1991)
McMahon and Bobby "The Brain" Heenan (briefly, after Mr. Perfect's face turn in 1992)
McMahon, Heenan and Jerry "The King" Lawler (December 12, 1992)
McMahon, Savage, and Lawler (January 2, 1993)
McMahon and Lawler (October 23, 1993)
McMahon and Reo Rodgers (for one week only)
McMahon and Stan Lane (November 27, 1993)
McMahon and Johnny Polo
McMahon and Dok Hendrix (April 15, 1995)
McMahon, Jim Ross, and Lawler
McMahon, Ross, and Hennig (December 2, 1995)
Ross and Hennig
Ross and Jim Cornette (November 10, 1996)

Interviewers
 "Mean" Gene Okerlund (1986-1993)
 Ken Resnick (1986-1987)
 Craig DeGeorge (1987-1988)
 Sean Mooney (1988-1993)
 Stan Lane (1993-1995)
 Todd Pettengill (1993-1997)

Trademark infringement
WWE abandoned the Superstars of Wrestling trademark when they changed the show's name to WWF Superstars in the early 1990s. Albert Patterson, a Wisconsin independent wrestling promoter, successfully trademarked the phrase in 1993.  Although there has been litigation between the WWE and Patterson, WWE has not been able to settle with Patterson for the usage of "Superstars of Wrestling". Due to this issue, WWE blurs the Superstars of Wrestling banners when archival content is shown on the WWE Network.

References

External links 
 

1986 American television series debuts
2001 American television series endings
1990s American television series
First-run syndicated television programs in the United States
Spike (TV network) original programming
Superstars of Wrestling
USA Network original programming